Placa de acero is a 2019 action comedy film produced by Magnifico Entertainment. It was directed and written by Abe Rosenberg and also written by Joseph Hemsani. It stars Alfonso Dosal, Adrián Vázquez, Eduardo España, and others. It was released in Mexico on 15 November 2019.

Plot 
Roberto Recto (Alfonso Dosal) has just graduated from the police academy as an element of excellence, not only in physical tests but also in knowledge and rectitude. As soon as he appears in his new workplace, the official Adrián Vázquez is assigned as his couple, an officer who represents the stereotype of slightly corrupt officers. Things are going wrong between the two from the first minute, but after a series of homicides perpetrated by a cannibal, both must put aside their differences in order to find the root of the problem and save civilians while understanding the motivations of the other and show the lack of empathy that exists towards the police.

Cast 
 Alfonso Dosal as Roberto Recto
 Adrián Vázquez as Adrián Vázquez
 Regina Blandón as News anchor
 Arnulfo Reyes Sánchez as Timo
 Quetzalli Cortés as Ismael "El Canibal"
 Carlos Valencia as Germán el Alemán

References

External links 
 

Mexican action comedy films
2019 action comedy films
2019 films
2010s Mexican films